Sending You a Little Christmas is the sixth Christmas album by American pop singer Johnny Mathis that was released on October 29, 2013, by Columbia Records. In addition to piano accompaniment on the title track by its composer Jim Brickman, this particular holiday release of original recordings (number six for Mathis) is distinguished by duets with guest vocalists Susan Boyle, Natalie Cole, Gloria Estefan, Vince Gill, Amy Grant, Billy Joel, and The Jordanaires.

Recording
Mathis recalls, "My producer, Fred Mollin, and I wanted to do some duets,"  and the number of singing partners for this one project far exceeded the tally of pairings arranged for any of his previous studio albums. In addition to covering several familiar holiday favorites "we decided that we wanted a newer song and we came up with Jim Brickman's ["Sending You a Little Christmas"]. He'd recorded it before, but it gave the record that finishing touch." Brickman's original recording of the song featured Contemporary Christian singer Kristy Starling and spent a week at number one on Billboard magazine's Adult Contemporary chart after debuting there in December 2003. The musician enjoyed the time spent collaborating with Mathis. "It was surreal, and definitely a ‘pinch me’ moment. I was so honored, and he sounds so beautiful." The fact that Brickman originated the music definitely added to his experience. "It wasn’t something like ‘Silent Night,’ where you're just performing. It was actually a song that I wrote."

Critical reception
After the album's release in October 2013 it was generally well-received, with some critics quite enthusiastic in their praise. BREATHEcast'''s Timothy Yap described the album as "the best amongst Mathis' canon of Christmas offerings," and Michael P. Coleman of Sac Cultural Hub wrote that Mathis was "serving as host of a wonderful Christmas party that you should think about crashing this season." Joe Szczechowski of Examiner.com was a bit more equivocal in his comments, describing it as a "solid" collection with Mathis in "fine vocal shape" but finding it lacking in comparison with his previous Christmas albums in noting that "there's nothing on Sending You a Little Christmas that would be considered a landmark recording.

Promotion
Mathis appeared on the ABC daytime talk show The View on December 9, 2013, to perform "Sending You a Little Christmas" and was also interviewed during the visit by Whoopi Goldberg, Barbara Walters, and guest co-host Clinton Kelly. He also performed the title song on The Tonight Show with Jay Leno the following week, on December 17.

Chart performance
The album Sending You a Little Christmas peaked at number 13 on Billboard magazine's list of the Top Holiday Albums and number 53 on the Billboard 200 album chart during the 2013 holiday season. It also became Mathis's first entry on the latter of the two since 2002's The Christmas Album, his previous release of new holiday material, and his highest charting entry there since 1978 when That's What Friends Are For, his duet album with Deniece Williams, reached number 19.  The title track also did well that winter during its run on the magazine's Adult Contemporary chart, where its number four showing was also the highest that he'd had there since 1978 when he and Williams took "Too Much, Too Little, Too Late" to number one.

Grammy nomination
On December 5, 2014, the album Sending You a Little Christmas was nominated for a Grammy Award for Best Traditional Pop Vocal Album and became Mathis's fourth release to be recognized in this category. His previous nods were for 1990's In a Sentimental Mood: Mathis Sings Ellington, 2005's Isn't It Romantic: The Standards Album, and 2010's Let It Be Me: Mathis in Nashville''.

Track listing
 "The Christmas Song (Chestnuts Roasting on an Open Fire)"  performed with Billy Joel  (Mel Tormé, Robert Wells) – 3:56
 "Have Yourself a Merry Little Christmas"  performed with Natalie Cole   (Ralph Blane, Hugh Martin) – 3:41
 "This Christmas" (Donny Hathaway, Nadine McKinnor) – 4:05
 "Sending You a Little Christmas"  performed with Jim Brickman (piano)   (James Brickman, William Mann, Victoria Shaw) – 3:53
 "Mary's Boy Child"  performed with Gloria Estefan   (Jester Hairston) – 3:09
 "This Is a Time for Love" (Dobie Gray, Bud Reneau) – 4:03
 "Do You Hear What I Hear?"  performed with Susan Boyle  (Gloria Shayne Baker, Noël Regney) – 3:52
 "Home for the Holidays"  performed with The Jordanaires   (Robert Allen, Al Stillman) – 3:07
 "Merry Christmas Darling" (Richard Carpenter, Frank Pooler) – 3:13
 "Decorate the Night" (Ray Chafin, Dobie Gray, Bud Reneau) – 3:33
 Medley  performed with Vince Gill and Amy Grant   – 3:36  a. "I'll Be Home for Christmas" (Kim Gannon, Walter Kent, Buck Ram)  b. "White Christmas" (Irving Berlin)
 "Count Your Blessings (Instead of Sheep)" (Irving Berlin) – 3:25

Personnel
From the liner notes for the original album:

 Musicians
John Hobbs – piano, keyboards
Pat Coil – piano, keyboards
Jim Brickman – piano
Tony Harrell – keyboards, accordion, harmonium
Catherine Styron-Marx – keyboards
Fred Mollin – keyboards, acoustic guitar, electric guitar, percussion, background vocals
Bryan Sutton - acoustic guitar
John Willis - acoustic guitar
Kerry Marx - acoustic guitar, electric guitar
Brent Mason - electric guitar
Larry Paxton – bass
Greg Morrow – drums, percussion
Shannon Forrest – drums
Paul Leim – drums, percussion
Paul Franklin - pedal steel guitar
Stuart Duncan – fiddle
Russell Terrell - background vocals
David Angell – violin
Conni Ellisor – violin
Mary Kathryn Vanosdale – violin
Janet Askey – violin
Gerald Greer – violin
Wei Tsun Chang – violin
Zeneba Bowers – violin
Stefan Petrescu – violin
David Davidson – violin
Pam Sixfin – violin
Allison Gooding – violin
Karen Winkelman – violin
Kristin Wilkinson – viola
Seanad Chang – viola
Monisa Angell – viola
Chris Farrell – viola
Dan Reinker – viola
Kathryn Plummer – viola
Anthony LaMarchina – cello
Sari Reist – cello
Matt Walker – cello
Julie Tanner – cello
Carol Rabinowitz – cello
Phyliss Sparks – harp
Erik Gratton – flute
Roger Weissmeyer - oboe, English horn
James Zimmerman – clarinet
Harry Ditzel - French horn
Beth Beeson - French horn
Radu Rusu - French horn
Jennifer Kumer - French horn
Jim Hoke – horn
Steve Patrick – horn
Roy Agee – horn
Doug Moffatt- horn
Steve Herman – horn
John Hinchey - horn

 Production
Johnny Mathis – vocals
Fred Mollin – producer 
Gordon Goodwin - conductor, string and horn arranger
Scott Lavender – conductor
Matthew McCauley – conductor
Kristin Wilkinson - contractor
Kyle Lehning - track engineer, mixer
"Teenage" Dave Salley - track and overdub engineer
Casey Wood - track engineer
Jared Clement - assistant engineer
John Furr - assistant engineer
Zach Allen - assistant engineer
Ronnie Pinnell - assistant engineer
Chris Wilkinson - assistant engineer
Charlie Paakari - assistant engineer
Chandler Harrod - assistant engineer
Will Wetzel - assistant engineer
Jason Lehning - additional recording
Jake Burns - additional recording
Jesse String - additional recording
Chris Owens - additional recording
Matt Rausch - additional recording
Eric Schilling - additional recording
Avril Mackintosh - additional recording
Steve Anderson - producer (Susan Boyle's vocal)
Cliff Masterson - producer (Susan Boyle's vocal)
Greg Calbi – mastering
Ed Blau – representation
John McL. Doelp - A&R
Sofia Abbasi – A&R coordinator
Jeff Dunas – photography
Dave Bett - art direction

References

Bibliography

 

2013 Christmas albums
Christmas albums by American artists
Pop Christmas albums
Johnny Mathis albums
Columbia Records albums
Albums recorded at Sunset Sound Recorders
Albums recorded at Capitol Studios